Belmond Khwai River Lodge is a safari lodge situated in Moremi Game Reserve. This forms part of the Okavango Delta in Botswana. The lodge is one of three that comprise Belmond Safaris, the others being Belmond Eagle Island Lodge and Belmond Savute Elephant Lodge. All three are reached from Maun, Botswana.

Khwai River Lodge was founded by Harry Selby (later immortalized in Hemingway's The Snows of Kilimanjaro) at his favourite campsite.

The lodge consists of tented accommodations, with traditional African thatched roofs, on raised wooden stilts. The area is known for its range of big game, which includes lion, leopard, giraffe, and buffalo. White rhinos have also been reintroduced. In addition, there are over 400 species of birds.

All three lodges that form Belmond Safaris were acquired by Orient-Express Hotels in 1992 under their original name "Gametrackers". The trio of lodges was also known for a time as Orient-Express Safaris. In 2014 the company changed its name to Belmond Ltd. and the lodge was renamed "Belmond Khwai River Lodge".

References

External links 
Official website

Belmond hotels